Zhyd (zhid or żyd) and Zhydovka (zhidovka or żydówka )   are terms for Jewish man and Jewish woman, respectively, in several Slavic languages. In some of those languages, they are considered pejorative.

Russian 
In modern Russian, it has been an anti-Semitic slur, similar to the word yid, since the mid-19th century. Under the influence of Russian, the terms have also become pejorative in modern Ukrainian (zhydivka / zhyd) and were banned by the Soviet authorities in the 1930s.

Ukrainian language 
Nikita Khrushchev commented on the term in his memoirs:I remember that once we invited Ukrainians, Jews, and Poles...to a meeting at the Lviv opera house. It struck me as very strange to hear the Jewish speakers at the meeting refer to themselves as 'yids'.… "We yids hereby declare ourselves in favor of such-and-such." Out in the lobby after the meeting, I stopped some of these men and demanded "How dare you use the word 'yid'? Don't you know it's a very offensive term, an insult to the Jewish nation?" 

"Here in the Western Ukraine it's just the opposite," they explained. "We call ourselves yids.... Apparently what they said was true. If you go back to Ukrainian literature...you'll see that 'yid' isn't used derisively or insultingly."

21st-century controversies
In December 2012, Ukrainian politician Ihor Miroshnychenko of the Svoboda party wrote on Facebook that Hollywood actress Mila Kunis, who is Jewish, is "not a Ukrainian but a zhydivka." Ukrainian Jews protested the use of the term. Svoboda officials and Ukrainian philologist Oleksandr Ponomariv argued that in the Ukrainian language, the word does not always have the anti-Semitic connotations that it does in the Russian language, though Ponomariv warned that the term would be considered offensive by Jewish people. 

The Ukrainian Ministry of Justice declared that Miroshnichenko's use of the word was legal because it is an archaic term for Jew and not necessarily a slur. In a letter of protest directed to then-Prime Minister of Ukraine Mykola Azarov, the term Zhydovka was described by Rabbi Marvin Hier of the US-based Simon Wiesenthal Center as an "insidious slur invoked by the Nazis and their collaborators as they rounded up the Jews to murder them at Babi Yar and in the death camps."

Iryna Farion defends the usage of the term zhyd in Ukrainian, claiming that the pejorative meaning to the previously neutral word was the result of Russification during the Soviet times, when the Russian word yevrei for 'Jews' was forced into the Ukrainian language.

Polish 
In Polish the words  have been described as neutral and non-pejorative, however there exist numerous derivatives, some of which can be pejorative, such as żydzisko. According to some other scholars, the word żyd and its derivatives can still be pejorative in some contexts, depending on who uses it and with what intention, and some people, both Jewish and non-Jewish, may be uneasy using it.

Other Slavic languages 

Notes

References

Antisemitic slurs
Hungarian words and phrases
Slavic words and phrases